Sarpsborgavisa (also SarpsborgAvisa) was a free newspaper published in Sarpsborg, Norway.

It was owned by Mediehuset Østfold, which is owned 99.3% by Edda Media.

It was closed from 31 May 2009.

References

Publications established in 2002
Publications disestablished in 2009
Defunct newspapers published in Norway
Newspapers published in Norway
Mass media in Østfold
Sarpsborg
2002 establishments in Norway
2009 disestablishments in Norway
Norwegian-language newspapers